A beer mix usually refers to an alcoholic beverage which also includes one or more other ingredients; the actual beer content is usually 40 to 70 per cent. Popular mix-ins include cola, lemon, and other fruit juices.

Today, beer mixes are an established part of German drinking culture and are available in a wide range of flavors and varieties, including non-alcoholic versions. Though marketed primarily towards young adults, they are enjoyed by consumers of all ages.

History 
Beer mixes have been available in Germany since the early 20th century. The “Radler" beer mix, which is still popular today, is seen as the pioneer of the market. The drink originated from the summer of 1922, when a Munich inn was so busy with cyclists that there was the threat of a beer shortage. In order to stretch the remaining beer supply, lemonade was added, creating the Radler.  Further variants, e.g., cola-beer and wheat beer mixes, followed. Up until 1993, it was only permitted to sell freshly prepared beer mixes due to legal requirements.

In 1995, the mid-sized German Karlsberg Brewery in Homburg (Saar) was the first brewery to use an amendment to the beer tax law which enabled the production and sale of ready-mixed beer mixes in bottles or tins. "MiXery Beer + Cola + X” was therefore one of the first ready-mixed cola beer drinks. This innovation was initially met with considerable criticism from the beer industry, but the first competitors appeared on the market in 2001 and the market subsequently saw a continuous increase in sales volume.

Further variants, which differed in the type of beer they contained as basis, followed. Schöfferhofer Grapefruit is hereby a pioneer in the wheat beer mixes and was launched on the market in 2007 by the Binding Brauerei Brewery.
 
A further variant and innovation in the beer mix market followed in 2014 with the introduction of so-called "MiXery Beer-Cocktails" by the Karlsberg Brewery. These are available in the varieties Caipirinha, Mojito and Sex on the Beach.

Alongside the alcoholic beer mix segment which accounts for the majority of the market, the non-alcoholic sector is also becoming increasingly significant, which means that a growing number of alcohol-free beer mix products are also being launched on the market.

The current leader of the German alcoholic beer mix market is still the MiXery brand with "MiXery Beer + Cola + X" followed by Krombacher Radler, Oettinger Radler, Beck’s Green Lemon, Schöfferhofer Grapefruit and MiXery Nastrov Flavour iced blue. Krombacher is the non-alcoholic beer mix leader.

Top 40 beer mix brands in German retail 
Descending according to turnover.

See also

Beer cocktail
Bierlikör

References

Beer
Cocktails with beer